Governor Harrison may refer to:

Albertis Harrison (1907–1995), 59th Governor of Virginia
Alistair Harrison (born 1954), Governor of Anguilla from 2009 to 2013
Benjamin Harrison V (1726–1791), 5th Governor of Virginia
Edward Harrison (British administrator) (1674–1732), Governor of Madras from 1711 to 1717
Henry Baldwin Harrison (1821–1901), 52nd Governor of Connecticut
William Henry Harrison (1773–1841), 1st Governor of the Indiana Territory